Andrés Pérez may refer to:
 Andrés Pérez (artist) ( 1660–1727), Spanish baroque painter
 Andrés Pérez (bishop) (died 1583), Spanish Roman Catholic bishop
 Andrés Pérez (footballer, born 1988) Puerto Rican footballer
 Andrés Pérez (footballer, born 1980), Colombian footballer
 Andrés Pérez de Ribas (1576–1655), Spanish Jesuit missionary
 Carlos Andrés Pérez, (1922–2010), Venezuelan politician